Sunday's Well is a suburb of Cork city in Ireland. It is situated in the north-west of the city, on a ridge on the northern bank of the River Lee. Sunday's Well is part of the Dáil constituency of Cork North-Central.

The area's GAA club is St Vincent's, with the parish's former church having the same name. Rugby union club Sundays Well RFC was formed in the area in 1906, before moving to Musgrave Park on the southside of the city in the 1940s. Sundays Well Boating and Tennis Club is also based nearby.

References

Articles on towns and villages in Ireland possibly missing Irish place names